Portneuf County is a historic county in Quebec, Canada west of Quebec City on the Saint Lawrence River in Canada.

The county seat was Cap-Santé. Previously named Hampshire County (after Hampshire, England) formed in 1792 at the end of the French Regime from the former Montreal District and as a constituent riding for the Legislative Assembly of Lower Canada before being renamed Portneuf County by a law of the province of Lower Canada (9 George IV ch. LXXII) in 1829. It was bounded on the west by Champlain County on the northeast by Quebec County, and on the south by Lotbiniere County. Portneuf County consisted of six former seigneuries.

In the early 1980s, Quebec abolished its counties and most of Portneuf County became the Portneuf Regional County Municipality. The southeastern part of the county was transferred to La Jacques-Cartier Regional County Municipality and the Quebec Urban Community (now Quebec City) while parts of western Portneuf County were transferred to Mékinac Regional County Municipality.

Constituent Towns, Municipalities and Parishes

 Neuville
 Pointe-aux-Trembles
 Cap-Santé
 Pointe-aux-Écureuils, Quebec
 Donnacona
 Sainte-Catherine-de-Portneuf
 Sainte-Jeanne-de-Pont-Rouge
 Notre-Dame-des-Anges
 Montauban-les-Mines
 Lac-au-Sables
 Saint-Augustin-de-Desmaures
 Grondines
 Deschambault
 Saint-Raymond
 Lac-Sergent
 Notre-Dame-de-Portneuf
 Saint-Basile-Sud
 Saint-Basile
 Notre-Dame-de-Portneuf
 Portneuf
 Fossambault-sur-le-Lac
 Duchesnay
 Jacques-Cartier
 Saint-Casimir
 Saint-Léonard-du-Port-Maurice
 Sainte-Christine-d'Auvergne
 Perthuis
 Saint-Gilbert
 Saint-Marc-des-Carrières
 Saint-Alban
 Saint-Thuribe
 Saint-Ubalde
 Val-Bélair

Creation of the County 

Initially, Portneuf County included the parishes of Saint-Casimir, Grondines, Deschambault, Cap-Santé, St-Basile, Saint-Raymond-Nonnat, Sainte-Catherine, Les Écureuils, Pointe-aux-Trembles, Saint-Augustin, Saint-Alban and the townships of Gosford, Alton, Roquemont of Montauban and Colbert.

See also

 Electoral districts of Lower Canada

References

External links
 
 Olive Tree Genealogy: Hampshire County

Capitale-Nationale
Former counties of Quebec
1829 establishments in Canada
Populated places disestablished in 1982